MAZ-535 is a Soviet army vehicle, an artillery tractor designed and developed by MAZ. Designed in the beginning of the 1950s.

MAZ-535A was capable of towing an R-14 IRBM.

Specifications 

 Wheel formula - 8×8
 Carrying capacity - 
 Maximum weight - 
 Trailer weight - 
 Velocity - 
 Dimensions - ××
 Track width - 
 Wheelbase - 
 Engine - Liquid-cooled diesel
 Power -  (at 1650 rpm)

Popular appearances
This vehicle is available in the game Spintires, Spintires: MudRunner.
Scifi movie "Attack on Titan" and Metal Gear Solid 3, and also in the video game Snowrunner.

External links

 http://legion.wplus.net/guide/army/tr/maz535.shtml 
 http://www.belarusguide.com/cities/commanders/Barys_Shapashnik.html

Military trucks of the Soviet Union
Artillery tractors
Military vehicles introduced in the 1950s